The women's 50 metre freestyle event at the 2004 Olympic Games was contested at the Olympic Aquatic Centre of the Athens Olympic Sports Complex in Athens, Greece on August 20 and 21.

Dutch swimmer and world record holder Inge de Bruijn managed to defend her title in this event, outside her record time of 24.58 seconds. The silver medal was awarded to France's Malia Metella, with a time of 24.89 seconds. Australia's Lisbeth Lenton, who finished behind Metella by two hundredths of a second (0.02), took home the bronze at 24.91. This was also the final appearance for de Bruijn at the Olympics, before she retired from her swimming career in 2007.

Records
Prior to this competition, the existing world and Olympic records were as follows.

Results

Heats

Semifinals

Semifinal 1

Semifinal 2

Final

References

External links
Official Olympic Report

W
2004 in women's swimming
Women's events at the 2004 Summer Olympics